The International Genealogical Index (IGI) is a database of genealogical records, compiled from several sources, and maintained by the Church of Jesus Christ of Latter-day Saints. Originally created in 1969, the index was intended to help track the performance of temple ordinances for the deceased.  

The IGI contains free genealogical information, submitted from various sources including names and data for vicarious ordinances by Latter-day Saints (LDS) researchers, records obtained from contributors who are not members of the church, and data extracted from microfilmed birth or marriage records. The index contains millions of records of individuals who lived between 1500 and 1900, primarily in the United States, Canada, Latin America, and Europe. Ongoing efforts are made to compile genealogical data from other regions and peoples.

The IGI contains many duplicate names, accumulated over time from many sources, and no real effort is made to validate the information. Many IGI records contain information on the submitter and date of submission (but only with the submitter's consent). The IGI is available at FamilySearch, the LDS genealogy website. 

In 1995, after a major controversy, a deal was struck between the Jewish and LDS communities to "Remove from the International Genealogical Index in the future the names of all deceased Jews who are so identified if they are known to be improperly included counter to Church policy." 

In 2008 The Vatican issued a statement directing its dioceses to block access to parish records from Mormons performing genealogical research.

See also
Family History Library
Genealogy and baptism

References

External links
 Search the IGI
 International Genealogical Index at FamilySearch Wiki
 "What is the IGI?" by Helen Schatvet Ullmann
 International Genealogical Index Coverage at FamilySearch Wiki

1969 works
Genealogy publications
Scientific databases
Genealogy and the Church of Jesus Christ of Latter-day Saints
Properties of the Church of Jesus Christ of Latter-day Saints